Konstantin Sonin is a Russian economist and mathematician. He is a professor at the University of Chicago Harris School of Public Policy, visiting professor at the Higher School of Economics in Moscow, Russia, research fellow at the Centre for Economic Policy Research (CEPR), London, and an associate research fellow at the Stockholm Institute of Transition Economics. In recognition for his outstanding research in the field of political economy, in December 2015, he was named the John Dewey Distinguished Service Professor of the University of Chicago.

Sonin is the co-founder of the joint HSE-NES Bachelor of Arts Program. Until December 2014, Sonin was vice-rector at the Higher School of Economics, but was forced to resign for political reasons.  Until August 2013, he was professor of Economics and vice rector at the New Economic School. His primary research interests are in political economics, development economics, and economic theory.

He has been published in leading academic journals in economics and political science, such as American Economic Review, Quarterly Journal of Economics, Econometrica, Review of Economic Studies, and others.

Sonin is a columnist for Vedomosti (in Russian) and The Moscow Times (until 2017). He contributes to major international and Russian media outlets. He is the author of "Sonin.ru: Lessons of Economics" (in Russian), a book aimed to a wide audience. In 2019, a new edition of the book was published, titled "When the Oil Runs Out and Other Economics Lessons" (in Russian).

Biography
Sonin was born in Moscow. He received his MSc in 1995, and PhD from Faculty of Mechanics and Mathematics of Moscow State University in 1998. In 2000–01, Konstantin was a Post-Doctoral Fellow at the Davis Center for Russian studies at Harvard. In 2001, he joined New Economic School as an Assistant Professor and in 2009 received tenure as a full Professor of Economics. In 2011–13, he was Vice Rector at New Economic School. As of August 2013, he is Professor of Economics at the Higher School of Economics. In August 2013 - December 2014, he was Vice Rector at the Higher School of Economics. Sonin is a co-founder of the joint HSE-NES Bachelor of Arts Program.

In 2004–2005, he was a member at the Institute for Advanced Study in Princeton, USA. In September 2009 – March 2010 he worked as a Visiting Professor of Managerial Economics and Decision Sciences at the Kellogg School of Management at Northwestern University. In May 2014 Konstantin was a visiting scholar in Becker Friedman Institute for Research in Economics at the University of Chicago.

As of September 2015, Konstantin Sonin is a professor at the University of Chicago.

Awards and memberships
 Member of the Science Council of the Ministry of Education and Science of the Russian Federation (2013 - 2017)
 Prime-Minister Award for Excellence in Teaching and Research, 2012
 Research Medal of the Global Development Network, 2004 (1st), 2006, 2009 (2nd)
 B. L. Ovsievich Memorial Prize, 2009 (2nd)
 Award for a Best Economist of the Russian Academy of Science, 2002, 2003

Other affiliations and memberships
 Research Director of the Center for Advanced Study at Higher School of Economics,
 Bank of Finland Institute for Economies in Transition, member of the Scientific Advisory Board
 Kiev School of Economics, member of the International Advisory Board
 Center for Economic Policy Research, London, UK, Research Fellow
 Journal of the European Economic Association, Associate Editor (till 2017)
 European Journal of Political Economy, member of the Editorial Board (till 2017)
 Journal of Comparative Economics, member of the Editorial Board (till 2017)

Major publications 
  Pdf.
Reprinted as:

References 

Moscow State University alumni
New Economic School alumni
Economists from Moscow
Living people
Academic staff of the Higher School of Economics
1972 births
The Moscow Times